Del Mar station is an at-grade light rail station on the L Line of the Los Angeles Metro Rail system. It is located between Arroyo Parkway and Raymond Avenue at Del Mar Boulevard, after which the station is named, in Pasadena, California. The station is located on the site of the historic Pasadena Santa Fe Depot and the station building, built in 1935, still stands on the property.

The property surrounding the station, situated on the southern edge of Old Town Pasadena, has been used extensively for transit-oriented development projects, including one apartment building that was built over the tracks, creating a tunnel for trains.

The light rail station opened on July 26, 2003, as part of the original Gold Line, then known as the "Pasadena Metro Blue Line" project. This station and all the other original and Foothill Extension stations will be part of the A Line upon completion of the Regional Connector project in 2023.

It is one of the L Line stations near the Rose Parade route on Colorado Boulevard and is used by people coming to see the parade.

This station features station art called Kinetic Energy, created by artist Ries Niemi.

History

Pasadena became a stop on the Atchison, Topeka, and Santa Fe Railway’s transcontinental line in 1887. The first station was a Victorian style building with tower, weather vane, and scalloped shingles.

In 1935, a new station was built, this time a Spanish Mediterranean style, one-story white stucco building with green trim and a red-tile roof. The station was designed by architect H.C. Gilman and featured ceramic tile designed by Pasadena craftsman Ernest Batchelder.

Pasadena was a stop on the Santa Fe's Super Chief, Chief, El Capitan and other major intercity streamliners, and became a popular with wealthy Easterners who “wintered” in Pasadena, and elite Hollywood actors.

Amtrak took over passenger train service from the Santa Fe on May 1, 1971, and leased the station building from the Santa Fe's real estate subsidiary, the Santa Fe Pacific Realty Corp., for its Southwest Chief and Desert Wind trains. The Desert Wind was re-routed via Fullerton in 1986.

In the early 1990s, the Santa Fe agreed to sell the tracks through Pasadena as part of a larger deal with the Los Angeles County Metropolitan Transportation Authority, which would use the right of way to build the Gold Line, then known as the "Pasadena Metro Blue Line" project. Southwest Chief service continued until a planned closure on January 16, 1994, to make way for future light rail trains. One day later, the 1994 Northridge earthquake badly damaged the bridge that carried the tracks of the Pasadena Subdivision over the 210 freeway in Arcadia.

As construction was underway on the new light rail line, an agreement was reached to use the  site for a transit-oriented development project to include 347 apartments, a 1,200 space underground parking garage to be used by Metro passengers and the apartment renters, public courtyards, retail shops, and the historic Santa Fe Depot, which would be fully restored. The project was designed by Nadel Architects and Moule & Polyzoides.

To enable the construction of the underground parking garage, in November 2001, a preservation firm sliced the historic train station into three pieces and moved them across Raymond Avenue to be stored in Central Park. It was returned to the station site in September 2003 and reused as a space for a restaurant.

The underground parking garage opened in April 2003, the light rail line opened on July 26, 2003, and the commercial/residential development opened in June 2006.

By 2007, Metro's 600 spaces in the underground parking garage were being underutilized. Most usage happened on weekdays and Metro still had enough excess capacity to rent spaces to a car dealership group. Meanwhile, the nearby parking garages for Old Town Pasadena shoppers were often full on weekends. In 2007, the City of Pasadena purchased Metro's share of the garage, opening it up to both commuters and shoppers.

Service

Station layout

Hours and frequency

Connections 
, the following connections are available:
 Foothill Transit: 
 Pasadena Transit: 20, 51, 52
 ArtCenter College of Design Shuttle

Notable places nearby 
The station is within walking distance of the following notable places:
Central Park
Los Angeles Music Academy College of Music
Old Town Pasadena
Pasadena Center and Civic Auditorium

References

L Line (Los Angeles Metro) stations
Transportation in Pasadena, California
Railway stations in the United States opened in 2003